Aleksandr Ivanovich Dolgushin (7 March 1946 in Moscow – 17 April 2006 in Moscow) was a Russian water polo player who competed for the Soviet Union in the 1968 Summer Olympics and in the 1972 Summer Olympics.

See also
 Soviet Union men's Olympic water polo team records and statistics
 List of Olympic champions in men's water polo
 List of Olympic medalists in water polo (men)
 List of world champions in men's water polo
 List of World Aquatics Championships medalists in water polo
 List of members of the International Swimming Hall of Fame

References

External links
 

1946 births
2006 deaths
Soviet male water polo players
Russian male water polo players
Olympic water polo players of the Soviet Union
Water polo players at the 1968 Summer Olympics
Water polo players at the 1972 Summer Olympics
Water polo players at the 1976 Summer Olympics
Olympic gold medalists for the Soviet Union
Olympic silver medalists for the Soviet Union
Olympic medalists in water polo
Medalists at the 1968 Summer Olympics
Medalists at the 1972 Summer Olympics
Sportspeople from Moscow